The Legion of Time is a collection of two science fiction novels by the American writer Jack Williamson.  It was first published by Fantasy Press in 1952 in an edition of 4,604 copies.  The novels were originally serialized in the magazines Astounding Science Fiction and Marvel Stories.

Despite the title Legion of Time, the stories do not in fact feature a body with such a name. The title may have been bestowed in an effort to emulate the success of Williamson's earlier "Legion of Space" series. The title story was originally announced as "The Legion of Probability".

Contents
 The Legion of Time
 After World's End

Reception
Boucher and McComas praised the title story for its "fine swashbuckling and much ingenious speculation", but found the other stories far inferior. 
Aldiss and Wingrove, comparing The Legion of Time to a fairy tale, declared that "its plot, while being philosophically meaningless, is a delight."

In 2014, the novel was nominated for a Retro-Hugo Award.

See also

Jonbar hinge

References

Sources

1952 short story collections
Science fiction short story collections
Fantasy Press books